The Continental Mark III is a personal luxury car marketed by Lincoln from 1969–1971 model years.  The namesake successor of the 1956–1957 Continental Mark II, the Mark III again served as the flagship vehicle of Ford Motor Company.  Offered as a two-door hardtop coupe, the Mark III was noted for its hidden headlights, rear spare-tire trunk bulge recalling the Mark II and its Rolls-Royce styled grille.  

The Mark III was developed as a direct competitor to the Cadillac Eldorado, creating a three-decade market rivalry between the Continental Mark series and the Eldorado.

To lower development and production costs over its largely hand-built predecessor, the Mark III shared its chassis underpinnings with the four door Ford Thunderbird.  Model-specific design elements, including hidden headlamps (with body-color covers) and the Rolls-Royce-style grille distinguished the Mark III from the Thunderbird and Lincoln Continental — while borrowing the same roof structure and rear windows, retractable into the C pillar, from the two door Thunderbird. Later models featured genuine walnut interior accents and a Cartier-branded clock. In a first for an American car, the 1970 Mark III was fitted with Michelin "X" Radial Tires as standard equipment.

Ford manufactured the Continental Mark III at its Wixom Assembly Plant facility (Wixom, Michigan) alongside the Thunderbird and the Lincoln Continental.  For 1972, in alignment with the redesign of the Thunderbird, the Mark III was superseded by the Continental Mark IV.

History 

The 1969 Continental Mark III was created when Lee Iacocca, Ford's vice-president, car and truck group, at the time, directed Design Vice President, Gene Bordinat, to "put a Rolls-Royce grille on a Thunderbird" in September 1965. Iacocca assigned development of the Mark III to the new "Strawberry Studio"- a special development preproduction team led by Bordinat. The Mark III was based on the fourth generation Lincoln Continental (1961–1969) and the four-door fifth generation Thunderbird introduced for 1967. With the Thunderbird "dying in the marketplace" Iacocca wanted to put the company's development investment to better use by expanding its platform over several models. The final design of the Mark III was introduced to a Lincoln-Mercury Focus Group in mid January 1966- receiving an overwhelmingly negative response from the group. Despite this feedback, both Iacocca and Henry Ford II loved the design and overruled objections. On March 24, 1966, the Mark III was given the green light for production.

The Mark III was intended to compete head-to-head with the top of the domestic personal luxury car market, Cadillac's heavily redesigned front wheel drive Eldorado.  This placed it above the second-tier premium personal luxury cars such as the Ford Thunderbird, Buick Riviera, Oldsmobile Toronado and Chrysler New Yorker coupe. As the Eldorado was built upon the Toronado frame, the Mark III was based on the Thunderbird's.  While the side-rail frame was identical to the Thunderbird's, the Mark III bore almost   more bodywork. Power was adequate from Lincoln's Ford 385 engine-based   V8.

The Mark III was unveiled at the 1968 running of the 12 Hours of Sebring on March 23, 1968, as an early 1969 model. The model was a remarkable commercial success because it combined the high unit revenue of a luxury model with the low development costs and fixed cost–amortizing utility of platform-sharing, in a car that was appealing enough to buyers that many units were sold. Iacocca said, "We brought out the Mark III in April 1968, and in its very first year it outsold the Cadillac Eldorado, which had been our long-range goal. For the next five years [Marks III and IV] we had a field day, in part because the car had been developed on the cheap. We did the whole thing for $30 million, a bargain-basement price because we were able to use existing parts and designs." Iacocca explained that this transformed the Lincoln-Mercury Division from losing money on every luxury car (via low unit sales on high fixed costs) to a profit center, making the new Mark series as big a success as any he ever had in his career—a remarkable statement from an executive who led the programs for the original Ford Mustang and the Chrysler minivan family. Iacocca explained of the Mark series, "The Mark is [in 1984] Ford's biggest moneymaker, just as Cadillac is for General Motors. It's the Alfred Sloan theory: you have to have something for everybody [...] you always need a poor man's car [...] but then you need upscale cars, too, because you never know when the blue-collar guy is going to be laid off. It seems that in the United States the one thing you can count on is that even during a depression, the rich get richer. So you always have to have some goodies for them."

The 1969 Continental Mark III was a spiritual successor of the limited-production, ultra-luxurious Continental Mark II produced by the short-lived Continental Division of Ford Motor Company between 1956 and 1957. Being a successor to the Continental Mark II, the new Mark III was branded and marketed as the make Continental within the Lincoln-Mercury Division structure and the Lincoln name did not appear on the vehicle, VIN plate, factory paperwork, window sticker, nor official Ford Motor Company brochures and advertising. The 1969 Continental Mark III was actually not the first to use this nomenclature,  which had been used on the 1958 Continental Mark III. The new Continental Mark III was sold alongside the separate but distinct Lincoln Continental line of sedans. This created branding confusion during the entire production run of the Continental Mark series until the 1986 model year when Continental was dropped as the make and the Mark VII was rebranded as a Lincoln with VINs adjusted accordingly. The new Mark III was built at the enlarged facility at the Wixom, Michigan assembly plant, home to subsequent generations of the model. The listed retail price was US$6,741 ($ in  dollars ) and 30,858 were manufactured.

Production Figures

Convenience Features 
Standard equipment included power steering, brakes, windows, vacuum-activated concealed headlamps, and [CORRECT NAME IS: Twin Comfort Lounge Seats with 2-way power standard and 6-way power with or without the optional passenger seat recliner option.] split bench electrically adjustable front seats. The instrument panel and trim panels on the doors featured simulated wood appliques in either English Oak or East-Indian Rosewood for 1969 models. For 1970–71 models, genuine walnut was used for the interior wood accents.  After a few months, a Cartier-branded clock became standard equipment. The upholstery was either the standard vinyl with cloth inserts or the optional leather [and over the years, both low back and high back front seats were available.]

A vinyl roof in cavalry twill pattern was optional on 1969 models, but examples without the vinyl roof were rare. One reason for the rarity of the plain-roofed version is the fact that the roof was made in two pieces and required extra preparation at the factory to conceal the seam; consequently, its availability was not widely advertised. Other options included the aforementioned leather interior, air conditioning, further power adjustments for the front seats, a variety of radios and 8-track tape players, tinted glass, and power locks. A limited-slip differential could be ordered, as could anti-lock brakes, called "Sure Trak". The Mark III was able to be ordered with an ASC sunroof -the second car to do so- only behind the 1968 Mercury Cougar. Cruise control was also an option. Finally, an automatic headlamp dimmer that dimmed the headlights for oncoming cars without driver intervention was available. Full instrumentation was standard.

1969 

Despite some bad reviews by the automotive press, the public took to the car, with some 7,000 built during the remainder of the 1968 model year, and another 23,858 cars for the 1969 model year, a respectable showing; Lincoln had always trailed Cadillac in production numbers, but the Mark III almost equalled the Eldorado, which tallied 23,333 for 1969. This was the start of a long, successful run for the Continental Mark Series. The listed retail price was US$6,741 ($ in  dollars ).

Because of its early introduction and extended production year, the 1969 model had several running changes made. Cars produced prior to July 1968 had a steering wheel pad with a much larger wood applique and Continental star logo than later cars. Cars produced prior to July 1968 featured a decorative stitching pattern on the face of the rear seat above the center arm-rest. After July 1968 the seatbelt retractors were relocated and eight additional exterior color choices were added. Cars produced before the second week of December 1968 had white indicator needles for all instruments and controls, and an electric clock with Arabic numerals was used. Cars produced after the second week of December 1968 utilized orange indicator needles for all instruments and controls, and a Cartier chronometer with Roman numerals was installed. All cars produced after December 31, 1968, were equipped with driver and front passenger head-rests as required by Federal mandate.

1970 
There were only small changes for 1970 and 21,432 were sold. The vinyl roof was made standard, windshield wipers were now concealed, and the wheel covers were redesigned. Michelin radial tires were standard equipment (a first for an American car), and a locking steering column/ignition switch replaced the dash-mounted switch per federal mandate. The metal horn ring used in '69 was deleted from the steering wheel, and replaced by a Rim Blow unit. Increasingly stringent Federal safety requirements mandated the addition of red reflectors to the rear bumper and yellow reflectors to the sides of the front parking lamp assemblies. Although horsepower remained unchanged at 365, Federal emissions requirements were met by the installation of "Thermactor" air injection pumps on the 460 CID engine. The interior wood appliques were upgraded to genuine Walnut. The door panels were redesigned and the power seat controls were moved from the seat edge to the door armrests. The pattern of the stitching on the seats was modified.

Motor Trend’s 1970 head-to-head review of the Eldorado vs. the Mark III gave the nod, barely, to the Mark III, beginning an annual "King of the Hill" series that ran for years.

1971 
1971 saw the Golden Anniversary for the Lincoln marque and the third and final year of Mark III production. Sales were better than ever, at 27,091 almost equal to the Eldorado's, a harbinger for the new decade.

Little changed from the 1970 model; tinted glass became standard, as did automatic climate-controlled air conditioning and Sure-Trak anti-lock brakes. High-back seats became standard (with low back seats optional), and a rare special-order floor console was made available requiring the use of Thunderbird front seats. Horsepower remained unchanged at 365, but the 460 CID V8 engine gained a more sophisticated thermostatic air cleaner assembly with its associated ductwork.

In its second annual King of the Hill contest, Motor Trend (July, 1971) again gave the Continental Mark III the nod by a wider margin than 1970 despite it being basically a warmed-over 1968 model while the Cadillac was all-new from the ground up. M/T noted that the Mark III's leather interior was far more luxurious and better detailed than the test Eldorado's nylon cloth and the Continental's real wood dash trim was far more attractive than the Cadillac's simulate.

1972 would see a new, even larger car, the Mark IV, replace the Mark III.

In Popular Culture 

Celebrities

The Lincoln Mark III was exceptionally popular among celebrities at the time of its debut. Notable owners included musicians Elvis Presley, James Brown, and Glen Campbell. Golfers Arnold Palmer and Byron Nelson served as brand ambassadors for the vehicle

Movies

The Continental Mark III has appeared in many movies since its debut.

Most notable is the 1977 horror film The Car which featured a highly customized 1971 Lincoln Continental Mark III designed by famed Hollywood car customizer George Barris. There were four cars built for the film in six weeks. Three were used as stunt mules, the fourth for closeups. The stunt mules were destroyed during production, while the fourth is now in a private collection.

The car's bodywork was painted in steel, pearl and charcoal coloring. The windows were laminated in two different shades, smoked on the inside and amber on the outside, so one could see out of it but not into it. In order to give "the car" a "sinister" look as requested by director Elliot Silverstein, Barris made the car's roof three inches lower than usual and altered its side fenders that same length again both higher and longer. According to Silverstein, the distinctive sound the horn of The Car makes spells out the letter X in Morse code.

The Continental Mark III was also prominently featured in the 1971 crime action thriller film, The French Connection.

In the 1976 comedy Cannonball, a porter named Beutell (played by Stanley Bennett Clay) races cross country in a Continental Mark III he had been hired to transport to New York.

In Goosebumps, a 1969 Mark III reprises its role as the "Haunted Car", paying homage to the 1977 film The Car. The Continental Mark III also appears extensively the 1973 film Gordon's War, and the 1993 crime comedy-drama Trouble Bound.

Television

Continental Mark IIIs appear in television on a regular basis. Most notably, the car was featured in the detective television series Cannon where, in season 1, detective Frank Cannon drove a 1971 Mark III, before switching to Mark IVs for later seasons.

The Mark III has been featured on many automotive TV shows including My Classic Car, Counting Cars, Fast N' Loud and Top Gear USA, where it was modified into an American "Popemobile".

See also 
 Personal luxury car

References

Notes

Bibliography

External links 

 Lincoln Continental Mark III VIN Information

Mark 3
Coupés
Rear-wheel-drive vehicles
1960s cars
1970s cars
Personal luxury cars